The 2012 Texas House of Representatives elections took place as part of the biennial United States elections. Texas voters elected state senators in all 150 State House of Representatives districts. State representatives serve for two-year terms.

At the beginning of the Eighty-second Texas Legislature following the 2010 Texas State House of Representatives elections, the Democrats held 49 seats to the Republicans' 101.

As of 2020, this is the last time Democrats won a state house seat in Chambers or Galveston county. This is also the first time a Republican has ever won a state house seat in Jefferson County (although the incumbent was a former Democrat who switched parties after winning re-election in 2010).

Redistricting 
Following the 2010 United States census, the Texas Legislature underwent its decennial redistricting. Texas House of Representatives districts follow the "county line rule," effectively granting individual counties delegations of state house seats based on their population. The census found that Texas had a population of 25,145,561 in 2010, giving each district an "ideal population" of 167,637 people. In 2000, the "ideal population for a district" was 139,006 people. Counties with at least this number of people must fully contain at least one state house district. Counties with sufficient population for two or more districts must be divided into that number of districts. Should a county have sufficient population for one or more district plus a fraction of another, one district from another county may extend into it to represent the remaining population. District delegations for counties with at least one district changed as follows following the 2010 Census:

As a result of these changes, the following districts drastically moved:

 District 33 moved from Nueces County to Collin County.
District 35 moved from South Texas to Hidalgo County.
 District 85 moved from West Texas to Fort Bend County.
 District 101 moved from Dallas County to Tarrant County.
 District 106 moved from Dallas County to Denton County.
 District 136 moved from Harris County to Williamson County.

Results

Statewide

Close races 
Seats where the margin of victory was under 10%:

Notable races 
District 43: Representative J.M. Lozano (D-Kingsville) was re-elected as a Democrat in 2010 with 77.90% of the vote. On March 5, 2012, he announced that he would switch parties and seek re-election as a Republican. He would later go on to narrowly win re-election in 2012 with 51.55% of the vote.

Results by district

References 

House of Representatives
Texas House of Representatives elections
Texas House